Digitus quartus or fourth digit can refer to:
 Ring finger (digitus quartus manus)
 Fourth toe (digitus quartus pedis)